Big Lake is an open body of water surrounded by marshy islands in Navigation Pool 9 of the Upper Mississippi River. It lies where the Iowa, Minnesota and Wisconsin borders come together, just north of Lansing, Iowa. It is part of the Upper Mississippi River National Wildlife and Fish Refuge.

The Army Corps of Engineers maintains the lake's integrity as fish habitat.

Sources
Army Corps of Engineers (retrieved 2 April 2007)

Lakes of the Mississippi River
Reservoirs in Iowa
Bodies of water of Allamakee County, Iowa